Giuseppe Oddo (9 June 1865 – 5 November 1954) was an Italian chemist. The Oddo–Harkins rule is named after him and William Draper Harkins. He published his findings in 1914 in a German journal.

References

Tommaso Campailla

1865 births
1954 deaths
Italian chemists